The English word militant is both an adjective and a noun, and it is generally used to mean vigorously active, combative and/or aggressive, especially in support of a cause, as in "militant reformers". It comes from the 15th century Latin "warrior" meaning "to serve as a soldier". The related modern concept of the militia as a defensive organization against invaders grew out of the Anglo-Saxon fyrd. In times of crisis, the militiaman left his civilian duties and became a soldier until the emergency was over, when he returned to his civilian occupation.

The current meaning of militant does not usually refer to a registered soldier: it can be anyone who subscribes to the idea of using vigorous, sometimes extreme, activity to achieve an objective, usually political. A "militant [political] activist" would be expected to be more confrontational and aggressive than an activist not described as militant.

Militance may or may not include physical violence, armed combat, terrorism, and the like. The Trotskyist Militant group in the United Kingdom published a newspaper, was active in labour disputes, moved resolutions in political meetings, but was not based on violence. The purpose of the Christian Church Militant is to struggle against sin, the devil and ". . . the rulers of the darkness of this world, against spiritual wickedness in high places" (Ephesians 6:12), but it is not a violent movement.

As adjective
Militant can mean "vigorously active and aggressive, especially in support of a cause" as in 'militant reformers'. The American Heritage Dictionary of the English Language, defines militant as "Having a combative character; aggressive, especially in the service of a cause". The Merriam-Webster Dictionary defines militant as "aggressively active (as in a cause)". It says that the word militant might typically be used in phrases such as 'militant conservationists' or 'a militant attitude'.

An example of the adjective usages is demonstrated when The New York Times ran an article titled Militant Environmentalists Planning Summer Protests to Save Redwoods describing a group that believes in "confrontational demonstrations" and "nonviolent tactics" to get across their message of preserving the environment. Another usage example includes 'a militant political activist', drawing attention to behaviours typical of those engaged in intensive political activism. The political protests headed by the Reverend Al Sharpton have been described as militant in nature in The Washington Post.

In general usage, a militant person is a confrontational person who does not necessarily use violence.

Militant is often used within some religious circles to denote the continuous battle of Christians (as church members) or the Christian Church in their struggle against sin. In particular, the Roman Catholic Church differentiates between Church militant and church triumphant. Ellen G. White, one of the founders of the Seventh-day Adventist church, says "Now the church is militant. Now we are confronted with a world in darkness, almost wholly given over to idolatry."

Such religious meaning must not be confused with the word 'belligerent' used to describe extremist religious behaviours found in some who, based on their extreme religious beliefs or ideologies, take up weapons and become involved in warfare, or who commit acts of violence or terrorism in an attempt to advance their extremist religious agendas. Such extremist groups can be Christian, Muslims, Jewish, or of any other religious affiliation.

As noun
A militant, as a noun, is a person who uses militant methods in pursuit of an objective; the term is not associated with the military. Militant can refer to an individual displaying aggressive behavior or attitudes.

Militant is sometimes used as a euphemism for terrorist or armed insurgent. (For more on this, see mass media usage below.)

The word "militant" is sometimes used to describe groups that do not name or describe themselves as militants, but that advocate extreme violence. In the early 21st century, members of groups involved in Islamic terrorism such as Al-Qaeda and ISIS are usually described as militants.

Mass media usage
Newspapers, magazines, and other information sources may deem militant a neutral term, whereas terrorist or guerrilla conventionally indicates disapproval of the behavior of the individual or organization so labeled, regardless of the motivations for such behavior. Militant, at other times, can refer to anyone not a member of formal armed forces engaging in warfare or serving as a combatant.

The mass media sometimes uses the term "militant" in the context of terrorism. Journalists sometimes apply the term militant to paramilitary movements using terrorism as a tactic. The mass media also has used the term militant groups or radical militants for terrorist organizations.

Legal inferences
Those resisting a foreign military occupation can be seen as not meriting the label terrorists because their acts of political violence against military targets of a foreign occupier do not violate international law. Protocol 1 of the Geneva Conventions gives lawful combatant status to those engaging in armed conflicts against alien (or foreign) occupation, colonial domination and racist régimes. Non-uniformed guerrillas also gain combatant status if they carry arms openly during military operations. Protocol 1 does not legitimize attacks on civilians by militants who fall into these categories.

In the UN General Assembly Resolution on terrorism (42/159, 7 December 1987). which condemns international terrorism and outlines measures to combat the crime, with one proviso: "that nothing in the present resolution could in any way prejudice the right to self-determination, freedom and independence, as derived from the Charter of the United Nations, of peoples forcibly deprived of that right [...], particularly peoples under colonial and racist regimes and foreign occupation or other forms of colonial domination, nor...the right of these peoples to struggle to this end and to seek and receive support [in accordance with the Charter and other principles of international law]."

Span of militancy
Militants occur across the political spectrum, including racial or religious supremacists, separatists, abortion opponents and proponents, and environmentalists. Examples of left-wing, right-wing, and advocacy group militants include militant reformers, militant feminists, militant animal rights advocates, and militant anarchists. The phrase militant Islam can suggest violent and aggressive political activity by Islamic individuals, groups, movements, or governments. There are also various secret societies that are classified as militant groups.

Using the president's authority to assassinate people worldwide who pose an "imminent threat" if "capture is not feasible", the Obama administration routinely called every victim of extrajudicial killing a militant.

Organizations
Among organisations that describe themselves as militants, the Ulster Young Militants are an example of a group resorting to violence (intimidation, arson, and murder) as a deliberate tactic.

Militant research
Militant research is defined as a type of research that is distinct from academia while also not synonymous with the political militant. It refuses the alienating practices of academia which separate researchers from the political meaning of their activity. In recent years it has become an increasingly popular approach for doing research especially since it attempt to resolve academic concerns related to representation and auto-critique.

See also
Compare and contrast these related articles:

 Activist – individuals in intentional action to bring about social or political change.
 Belligerent – one of a contracting parties in a conflict.
 Church militant (Ecclesia Militans) – Christians who are living.
 combat or fighting – purposeful conflict between one or more persons, often involving violence and intended to establish dominance over the opposition.
 combatant – a soldier or guerrilla member who is waging war.
 crusader – Christian warriors in a series of several military campaigns—usually sanctioned by the Papacy—that took place during the 11th through 13th century. Used contemporarily to describe people that attack Islam, whether perceived or real.
 demonstrator – an individual who is publicly displaying the common opinion of an activist group, often economically, political, or socially, by gathering in a crowd, usually at a symbolic place or date, associated with that opinion.
 extremist – ideas or actions thought by critics to be hyperbolic and unwarranted.
 filibuster or freebooter – is someone who engages in an (at least nominally) unauthorized military expedition into a foreign country or territory to foment or support a revolution.
 fundamentalism – anti-modernist movements in various religions.
 guerrilla – small combat groups and the individual members of such groups operating with small, mobile and flexible combat groups called cells, without a front line.
 imminent threat – a criterion in international law, developed over the Caroline affair, described as being "instant, overwhelming, and leaving no choice of means, and no moment for deliberation."; the Caroline test has as additional criterion that the response must be proportionate to the threat.
 insurgent – an armed rebellion by any irregular armed force that rises up against an established authority, government, administration or occupation.
 jihadist – political neologism used to describe violent persons and movements in contemporary Islam.
 man-at-arms – medieval term for a soldier, almost always a professional.
 mercenary – soldier who fights, or engages in warfare primarily for private gain, usually with little regard for ideological, national or political considerations.
 military – any armed force, it generally refers to a permanent, professional force of soldiers or guerrillas.
 Militant (or the Militant tendency) – Trotskyist group active as an entryist group within the UK Labour Party who were found to be in breach of the Labour Party's constitution. The group existed in this form from 1964 to 1991.
 mujahideen – Muslim fighters; literally means "strugglers" or "people doing jihad". The traditional Arabic term for a "jihadist".
 partisan – member of a lightly equipped irregular military force formed to oppose control of an area by a foreign power or by an army of occupation.
 privateer – a private person who engages in maritime warfare under a commission of war, and often is rewarded with booty obtained.
 protester – expresses relatively overt reaction to events or situations: sometimes in favour, more often opposed.
 preemptive strike – a surprise attack to counter an anticipated enemy offensive.
 rebel – individuals who participate in rebellions.
 Reform Movement – kind of social movement that aims to make gradual change, or change in certain aspects of the society rather than rapid or fundamental changes.
 rioter – people in crowds committing crimes or acts of violence
 soldier – person who has enlisted with, or has been conscripted into, the armed forces of a sovereign country and has undergone training and received equipment to defend that country or its interests.
 vigilante – any individual(s) who establish their own form of justice or forms a collaboration with law enforcement to fight against criminal activities. Usually militant, armed, and not complying with the rule of law.
 war – state of widespread conflict between states, organisations, or relatively large groups of people, which is characterised by the use of violent, physical force between combatants or upon civilians.
 warrior – person habitually engaged in combat. In tribal societies, warriors often form a caste or class of their own.
 zealot – an individual who is zealous on behalf of God.

References

English words
Activism
Rebels by type
Definitions

da:Militans
de:Militanz
fr:Militant
ja:過激派
vi:Chiến binh quá khích